1981 Empress's Cup Final was the 3rd final of the Empress's Cup competition. The final was played at Nishigaoka Soccer Stadium in Tokyo on March 21, 1982. Shimizudaihachi SC won the championship.

Overview
Defending champion Shimizudaihachi SC won their 2nd title, by defeating FC PAF 6–0. Shimizudaihachi SC won the title for 2 years in a row.

Match details

See also
1981 Empress's Cup

References

Empress's Cup
1981 in Japanese women's football